Golden Goddess of Rio Beni is a 1964 adventure film directed by Franz Eichhorn and Eugenio Martín and starring Pierre Brice, Gillian Hills and René Deltgen. It was made as a co-production between Brazil, France, Spain and West Germany.

It is a remake of a 1950 film.

Cast
 Pierre Brice as Jim
 Gillian Hills as Aloa
 René Deltgen as Bernard
 Harald Juhnke as Tom
 Emma Penella as Dinah
 Hans von Borsody as Jeff
 Gil Delamare

References

Bibliography 
 Bock, Hans-Michael & Bergfelder, Tim. The Concise CineGraph. Encyclopedia of German Cinema. Berghahn Books, 2009.

External links 
 

1964 films
1964 adventure films
German adventure films
Spanish adventure films
French adventure films
Brazilian adventure films
West German films
1960s German-language films
Films directed by Franz Eichhorn
Films directed by Eugenio Martín
Films set in Brazil
Constantin Film films
Remakes of Brazilian films
Remakes of German films
1960s German films
1960s French films
German-language French films